The Samsung Galaxy A80 is a mid-range Android smartphone manufactured by Samsung Electronics as part of its fifth-generation Galaxy A series lineup. It was launched at the Samsung Galaxy Event in Bangkok, Thailand on April 10, 2019, and released on May 29, 2019. Its most notable feature is its lack of a front facing camera, opting instead for a unique pop-up camera, allowing for a nearly bezel-less display.

Specifications

Hardware 
The Samsung Galaxy A80 has a 6.7-inch full-HD+ (2400x1080 pixels) Super AMOLED "New Infinity Display" with a 20:9 aspect ratio; it is the first Samsung phone featuring the "New Infinity" technology. The phone is powered by the newly unveiled Snapdragon 730G SoC, an octa-core processor with two cores clocked at 2.2 GHz and six cores clocked at 1.7 GHz. It also comes with 8GB of RAM and 128GB of onboard storage. Its storage cannot be expanded via a micro SD card. The phone measures 165.2x76.5x9.3mm. The phone also comes with a 3700 mAh battery and 25W Super Fast Charging technology.

Camera 

The Samsung Galaxy A80 is equipped with a triple-camera array consisting of a main 48-megapixel camera, flanked by an ultrawide 8-megapixel camera, and a ToF sensor. It also introduced a rotating camera; the back facing camera slides up and rotates forward automatically when put in selfie mode.

Software 
The Samsung Galaxy A80 runs on Android 9.0 (Pie) with One UI. The phone has many features including Bixby, Samsung Pay, Samsung Health, and Samsung Knox.

As of February 2022, it supports One UI 3.1 with Android 11.  Samsung also promises 4 years of security updates for this device,  so users will get updates up to 2023.

Reception
John McCann from TechRadar enjoyed the pop-up camera, notchless screen, and ample power and storage; however, he expressed concerns regarding its durability, a lack of headphone jack, and the build's thick grip. Overall, he said: "Don't be put off by the pop-up, rotating camera gimmick. It's fun to use, but the Samsung Galaxy A80 looks to be much more than just a one-trick pony."

See also
Samsung Galaxy A series
Samsung Galaxy

References

External links
 

Samsung Galaxy
Mobile phones introduced in 2019
Android (operating system) devices
Samsung mobile phones
Mobile phones with multiple rear cameras
Mobile phones with 4K video recording